Xu Chen (born 11 November 1991) is a Chinese footballer currently playing as a forward for Jiangxi Beidamen.

Career statistics

Club
.

Notes

References

1989 births
Living people
Footballers from Dalian
Footballers from Liaoning
Chinese footballers
Association football forwards
China League One players
China League Two players
Beijing Sport University F.C. players
Jiangxi Beidamen F.C. players